Erupa argentilinea is a moth in the family Crambidae. It was described by Herbert Druce in 1910. It is found in Colombia.

References

Erupini
Moths described in 1910